Fantastic 4 is an action-adventure beat 'em up video game based on the  2005 film of the same name, developed by 7 Studios and published by Activision. Players play as the characters of the Marvel Comics superhero team Fantastic Four using combos and special attacks to fight their way through hordes of enemies and bosses. Ioan Gruffudd, Jessica Alba, Michael Chiklis, Chris Evans and Julian McMahon reprise their roles for the game. It was followed by Fantastic Four: Rise of the Silver Surfer, itself based on the film of the same name, released in 2007, with 2K taking over Activision from publishing the game.

Gameplay
The game is primarily a third-person action beat 'em up game, with minor platforming and puzzle elements, which can be played either solo or in co-op. Players move through the levels as one or two members of the Fantastic Four, defeating various enemies, such as robots, street punks, underground creatures, and cosmic aliens, and destroying objects. Each of the four have their special abilities:

Mister Fantastic has the ability to shift his body (or portions of the same) into a super-malleable state, enabling him to stretch, contract, deform, expand, elongate, compress or otherwise reshape his physical form at his will. He can also hack terminals by aligning rings in a puzzle.
Invisible Woman possesses the ability to bend light and ultimately become invisible (wholly or partially) at will. She also has telekinetic powers and the ability to project force energy from her body.
The Human Torch can manipulate fire.  He usually allows his entire body to be engulfed in flames considering his body can sustain the highest levels of heat.  Another ability of his is flight, which players can use in the game. He can also create holes in locked doors and throw fireballs as a ranged attack.
The Thing is incredibly strong and has an exterior stronger than diamonds. Ben Grimm can carry heavy objects with ease and deal heavy damage to enemies, as players will find out while playing as this character.
As the players defeat enemies and accomplish tasks, they earn points that can be cashed in for upgrades to the characters' attacks, as well as bonus artwork, interviews with the film's cast, and biographies. By performing different button combinations, the players build up an orange bar, which when full, grants them a super move, which varies depending on the character (The Thing stomps around with a powerful spinning attack, Mr. Fantastic turns into a wheel that damages anything he comes into contact with, and both Invisible Woman and Human Torch have a radial clearing attack). One team member can also "buff" another member, ex. Invisible Woman encases Mr. Fantastic in a protective bubble for a short time.

The game includes a number of villains and characters not featured in the film, many of whom are based on their Ultimate Universe versions like the Yancy Street Gang, Mole Man, Puppet Master, and Nick Fury. Diablo, Dragon Man, Blastaar, and Annihilus appear as bosses, during which players have control of the entire team.
Players also can find hidden "F4 Tokens" in each level, which unlock arenas for the game's combat arena mode, as well as bonus interviews with Stan Lee and the game's developers. Completing the game on certain difficulties unlocks two bonus levels in Latveria, set in the continuity of the comics. With a cheat code, an extra level set in Hell can also be unlocked.

Plot

The game begins with Reed, Sue, and Johnny on a roof lying helpless after being knocked unconscious by a blast from Doctor Doom.  Sue is the first to recover, so when she sits up and turns around, Dr. Doom is preparing to fire an electric blast at them. Sue holds it off with her force field and calls Ben Grimm for help. Then it cuts away to Ben, who is recovering in the transformation chamber after having his rocklike exterior genetically removed from him.  As he contemplates why the circumstances have led to this, he remembers the period when all of this happens.

This is when it reverts to the beginning of the movie: Reed signs the pact, they go into space, and Ben gets the samples ready.  In space, they are hit by a cosmic storm which alters their DNA and gives them superpowers. If it hadn't been for Victor, they might never have arrived back to Earth and into his medical compound, where they recovered.  When Ben discovers that he has become a monster-like figure, he deserts the other three and heads home.

Ben runs on a rampage to try to calm himself. This brings the army to New York under the control of a deep, dark, sinister figure who is yet to be revealed and they try to get Ben under control.  However, after Ben and the other three rescue a fire truck from falling off the Brooklyn Bridge, the forces lay off and watch the Fantastic Four to see if they become hostile.

Reed attempts to find another power source, but is interrupted by a call for help.  It seems that strange creatures have invaded Grand Central Station and the police seem to have no effect against them.  The Fantastic Four stop the creatures from invading the city and face their leader, the Mole Man and his mighty pet.  Because of the utter destruction caused by their fight with this giant monster, the city is in a mess and Victor blames Reed for all this mess.

With Ben in hand, Reed sets out to identify their mutation and possibly cure them of it.  He constructs a machine with Victor's help which will use cosmic rays to reverse the signal being sent through their bodies by the mutation.  He then turns to sources to power this machine and identifies a cosmic meteor that landed in the jungle of southern Mexico. They travel to Tikal to retrieve this meteor when they encounter Diablo, who desires to have this meteor so he can harness its power to conquer the world. The Fantastic Four defeat him and bring the meteor back, but its power is insufficient to power the machine. Later, Victor invites Sue to the opening of his Egyptian wing in the museum that night.

While they are there, Alicia Masters is kidnapped by the mummy creatures who have come to life by the Puppet Master, which throws Ben into an outrage.  Reed intends to disable the security system to free her, but they have to deal with animated mummies and dinosaurs. They free Alicia but end up destroying half the museum while repelling the reanimated creatures, which infuriates Victor to no end.

In his last attempt to alleviate his anger towards them, he has a conversation with Sue in which he attempts to find out why she continues to stay with Reed. She says she can't abandon them because they're her family now, which prompts Victor to send Doombots after them to destroy them after they finish their meeting. The four have a massive battle in Times Square, which they nearly demolish with the help of the VDI Mechs, prompting Nick Fury, to take them to the Vault prison for their safe keeping.

They arrive there and are quarantined until Dragon Man decides to break out and cause utter chaos. The Fantastic Four's security systems are deactivated and they try to restore order.  They are successful in their mission so when they reach the entrance at the top of the prison, they encounter Fury who agrees to release them on one condition: that they find out what happened to his laboratory.
When they arrive, they discover it has been taken over by mutated plants and insectoid creatures and they must destroy the station after obtaining the power source they need to finish powering Reed's transformation chamber.  This proves to be successful and the machine is powered up to its maximum.

With this knowledge, Victor travels to the Baxter Building with the intent to defeat the Fantastic Four.  He sets Reed's security systems against them and lures Ben to the transformation chamber where he steals his power.  The remaining three fight against an enhanced Dr. Doom but his power is too great and they are defeated.  Ben, however, feels terrible for leaving his friends just because he wanted to look normal again, so he decides to re-enter the transformation chamber and turn back into the Thing. Dr. Doom is about to destroy them when Ben busts out onto the roof and savagely attacks him, allowing his teammates to recover. They fall to the street and the other three join them there to finish Doom once and for all.

Development
Zak Penn and Martin Signore co-wrote the story for the game. Penn also wrote a draft of the film, which served as the basis of the game.

Reception

Reviews of the game were mixed.  GameRankings gave it a score of 62.18% for the PlayStation 2 version, 61.50% for the Xbox version, 65.02% for the GameCube version, 64.35% for the PC version, and 55.50% for the Game Boy Advance version. Likewise, Metacritic gave it a score of 64 out of 100 for the PS2 version, 62 out of 100 for the Xbox version, 61 out of 100 for the GameCube version, 63 out of 100 for the PC version, and 57 out of 100 for the GBA version.

IGN rated the game a 6.5 of 10 stating that "Fantastic 4 is a passable action game with some interesting ideas. In short, rent this one first".

The game got some retrospective praise for paving the way of Marvel: Ultimate Alliance.

Music
The game is notable for having four bands record brand new songs to be used as the themes for the characters. The bands who contributed songs and who their song was for are:
Taking Back Sunday'' — "Error Operator" (Mr. Fantastic)
Go Betty Go — "Everywhere" (Invisible Woman)
The Explosion — "I'm On Fire" (Human Torch)
Jurassic 5 — "Clobberin' Time" (The Thing)

Sales
The game sold 320,000 units and generated more than $16 million in revenue.

References

External links

Marvel video games on Marvel.com

2005 video games
20th Century Studios video games
3D beat 'em ups
Activision beat 'em ups
Beenox games
Cooperative video games
Fantastic Four (film series)
Game Boy Advance games
GameCube games
PlayStation 2 games
Superhero video games
Video games based on adaptations
Video games based on Fantastic Four films
Video games based on films
Video games based on works by Michael France
Video games developed in the United States
Video games featuring female protagonists
Video games set in New York City
Video games set in Mexico
Video games set in Colorado
Windows games
Xbox games
Torus Games games
Multiplayer and single-player video games
7 Studios games